Ženski košarkaški klub Loznica, commonly referred to as ŽKK Loznica, is a women's professional basketball club based in Loznica, Serbia. The club was founded in 1973. Before 2001, it was a part of the men's basketball club KK Loznica.

History 
In the season 2017/2018, ŽKK Loznica played in Serbian First Women's Basketball League.

Home arenas 

The team play domestic home matches in the Lagator Hall.

Notable players 

  Aleksandra Crvendakić

See also 
 KK Loznica

References 

Women's basketball teams in Serbia
Women's basketball teams in Yugoslavia
Loznica
Loznica
2001 establishments in Serbia